Choose Your Own Adventure is a series of children's gamebooks where each story is written from a second-person point of view, with the reader assuming the role of the protagonist and making choices that determine the main character's actions and the plot's outcome. The series was based upon a concept created by Edward Packard and originally published by Constance Cappel's and R. A. Montgomery's Vermont Crossroads Press as the "Adventures of You" series, starting with Packard's Sugarcane Island in 1976.

Choose Your Own Adventure, as published by Bantam Books, was one of the most popular children's series during the 1980s and 1990s, selling more than 250 million copies between 1979 and 1998. When Bantam, now owned by Random House, allowed the Choose Your Own Adventure trademark to lapse, the series was relaunched by Chooseco, which now owns the trademark. Chooseco does not reissue titles by Packard, who has started his own imprint, U-Ventures.

Format 
Originally created for 7- to 14-year-olds, the books are written in the second person. The protagonist—that is, the reader—takes on a role relevant to the adventure, such as a private investigator, mountain climber, race car driver, doctor, or spy. Certain books in the series allow readers choice of whom to take the role of, for example, in an adventure book, readers may be prompted to choose between a climber, a hiker, or a traveler. Stories are generally gender- and race-neutral, though in some cases, particularly in illustrations, there is the presumption of a male reader (the target demographic group). In some stories, the protagonist is implied to be a child, whereas in other stories, they are an adult.

The stories are formatted so that, after a few pages of reading, the protagonist faces two or three options, each of which leads to further pages and further options, and so on until they arrive at one of the many story endings. The number of endings varies from as many as 44 in the early titles to as few as 7 in later adventures. Likewise, there is no clear pattern among the various titles regarding the number of pages per ending, the ratio of good to bad endings, or the reader's progression backwards and forwards through the pages of the book. This allows for a realistic sense of unpredictability, and leads to the possibility of repeat readings, which is one of the distinguishing features of the books.

As the series progressed, both Packard and Montgomery experimented with the gamebook format, sometimes introducing unexpected twists such as endless page loops or trick endings. Examples include the "paradise planet" ending in Inside UFO 54-40, which can only be reached by cheating or turning to the wrong page by accident.

History 
According to Packard, the core idea for the series emerged from bedtime stories that he told to his daughters, revolving around a character named Pete and his adventures: "I had a character named Pete and I usually had him encountering all these different adventures on an isolated island. But that night I was running out of things for Pete to do, so I just asked what they would do". His two daughters came up with different paths for the story to take and Packard thought up an ending for each of the paths: "What really struck me was the natural enthusiasm they had for the idea. And I thought: 'Could I write this down?'"

Packard soon developed this basic premise into a manuscript titled The Adventures of You on Sugar Cane Island. He set out in 1970 to find a publisher but was rejected by nine publishing companies, causing him to shelve the idea. In 1975, he was able to convince Ray Montgomery, co-owner of Vermont Crossroads Press, to publish the book and it sold 8,000 copies, a large amount for a small local publishing house. The series was later marketed to Pocket Books, where it also sold well, but Montgomery believed that it would sell better if a bigger publisher could be found. After some discussion, Montgomery was able to make a contract for the series with Bantam Books. Packard and Montgomery were selected to write books for the series, including the contracting out of titles to additional authors.

The famous phrase “Choose Your Own Adventure” was born when Ed Packard sold his second and third books. The second, Deadwood City, was a Western saga, and junior editor Dinah Stevenson was given the assignment to create a jacket line that would explain this unfamiliar narrative style to readers; Stevenson came up with "Choose your own adventure in the Wild West". The phrase was adapted for the next title with the tag line, The Third Planet from Altair: Choose your own adventure in outer space.

The series was highly successful after it began printing with Bantam Books. A 1981 article in The New York Times, followed by an interview with Packard on The Today Show, provided free publicity. The book series prompted the creation of three other series by authors with Bantam Books that worked with the same format. Nineteen other series of the same format begun being published by rival publishing houses. The large popularity of the concept led to the titling of a new genre of writing for the format, which was called the gamebook.

By the 1990s, the series faced competition from computer games and was in a decline. The series was discontinued in 1999, but was relaunched by a new company, Chooseco, in 2003. Montgomery died in 2014; his final Choose Your Own Adventure book was Gus vs. the Robot King.

In June 2018, Z-Man Games issued a licensed co-operative board game called Choose Your Own Adventure: House of Danger inspired by R. A. Montgomery's book in the series.

In January 2019, Chooseco initiated a trademark infringement legal challenge against Netflix for the film Black Mirror: Bandersnatch. Netflix settled the suit in November 2020.

Literary reception 
A Smithsonian article criticizes the style as "formulaic" and quotes a scholar stating that "in terms of literary quality, many of the multiple-storyline books are true skunks".

See also 

 Choose Your Own Adventure: The Abominable Snowman
 Endless Quest
 Fighting Fantasy
 Give Yourself Goosebumps
 Grailquest
 Interactive fiction
 List of Choose Your Own Adventure books
 Lone Wolf
 The Garden of Forking Paths
 Twistaplot
 Usborne Puzzle Adventure series
 Visual novel

Notes

References

External links 
 

 
Book series introduced in 1979